Stacy or Stacey may refer to:

Places 
In the United States:
 Stacy, California, an unincorporated community
 Stacy, Kentucky
 Stacy, Minnesota, a city
 Stacy, Virginia, a village

People 
 Stacy (given name)
 Stacy (singer) (born 1990), Malaysian singer, winner of the sixth season of Akademi Fantasia

Surname 
 Alfred E. Stacey (1846–1940), American chair manufacturer and politician
Billy Stacy (1936–2019), American football player and politician
 Brian Stacey (1946–1996), Australian conductor
 Charles Perry Stacey (1906-1989), Canadian historian of 20th century Canada
 Clyde Stacy (1936–2013), American singer
 Enid Stacy (1868–1903), British activist
 Francis Stacey (1830–1885), Welsh-born cricketer and law officer
 George Stacey (footballer) (1881–1972), English footballer
 George Stacey (1787–1857), Quaker abolitionist
 Glenys Stacey (born 1954), British solicitor and civil servant
 Jack Stacey (born 1996), English footballer
 Jess Stacy (1904–1995), American jazz pianist
 Kaye Stacey (born 1948), Australian mathematics educator
 Mark Stacey (born 1964), Welsh antiques expert
 Ralph D. Stacey (born 1942), British organizational theorist and Professor of Management
 Spider Stacy (born 1958), English singer-songwriter-musician
 Steve Stacey (born 1958), Australian rugby league footballer
 Steve Stacey (born 1944), English association football player
 Warren Stacey (born c. 1979), British R&B singer-songwriter
 William Stacy (1734–1802), American Revolutionary War officer and pioneer to the Ohio Country
 Zac Stacy (born 1991), American football player

Fictional characters 
 Gwen Stacy, a character in the Spider-Man comic books
 George Stacy, Gwen's father
 Stacy, one of the main characters in Dick Figures
 Stacy Stickler, one of the main characters in the Canadian animated series Stickin' Around
Stacy, the daughter of Octodad and Scarlet in the video game Octodad: Dadliest Catch

Other uses 
 Atari Stacy, a computer in the Atari ST family
 Stacy (film), a 2001 Japanese zombie horror film
 Stacey (film), a 1973 exploitation film directed by Andy Sidaris
 "Stacy", a 2010 song by Iyaz from Replay

See also 
 Steacy, a surname

English-language surnames